This list of fictional primates is a subsidiary to the list of fictional animals. The list is restricted to notable non-human primate characters from the world of fiction including chimpanzees, gorillas, orangutans, bonobos, gibbons, monkeys, lemurs, and other primates.

Literature

Comics

Primates in film

Animation

Television

Video games

Rajang (Monster Hunter) An ape-goat cross that is also a Fanged Beast.

Mythology
Primates have appeared in many religions and mythologies. See: https://en.wikipedia.org/wiki/Monkey_god

Other
Fatz Geronimo, a keyboard-playing gorilla for The Rock-afire Explosion at Showbiz Pizza Place.

See also
 List of individual apes
 List of individual monkeys

References

 Primates